"Shoo-Be-Doo-Be-Doo-Da-Day" is a 1968 single released by American and Motown recording artist Stevie Wonder. The song, co-written by Wonder and produced by Henry Cosby and Sylvia Moy, was the first to showcase Wonder's talents at the clavinet and was one of his first successful co-written tracks during his 1960s Motown period. The song reached number nine on the Billboard Hot 100 pop singles chart in 1968, and went to number one on the R&B chart.

Billboard described the single as "a groovy rock number loaded with teen sales appeal."  Cash Box said it was a "delighting combination of Detroit and Gospel strains" with a "generally relaxed rock mood with snatches of fire from the ork build and outstanding vocal."

"Shoo-Be-Doo-Be-Doo-Da-Day" was one of the first songs to use a clavinet in a popular music recording.

Personnel
 Lead vocals and clavinet by Stevie Wonder
 Backing vocals by The Andantes (Jackie Hicks, Marlene Barrow, and Louvain Demps)
 Other instrumentation by The Funk Brothers

Chart positions

References

1968 singles
Stevie Wonder songs
Michael Jackson songs
Songs written by Stevie Wonder
Songs written by Sylvia Moy
Songs written by Henry Cosby
Tamla Records singles
1968 songs
Song recordings produced by Stevie Wonder